Institutional Venture Partners (IVP) is a US-based private equity investment firm focusing on later-stage venture capital and growth equity investments. IVP is one of the oldest venture capital firms, founded in 1980.

History
While Reid W. Dennis was an analyst at the Fireman's Fund Insurance Company starting in 1952, he started an informal network of screened individual investors (now called angel investors). In 1974, Dennis founded Institutional Venture Associates (IVA), funded by six institutions such as American Express. Burton J. McMurtry and David Marquardt, who had been involved with IVA, left and founded Technology Venture Investors, the first investor in Microsoft. These were some of the first venture capital firms located on Sand Hill Road near Stanford University, within Silicon Valley. With his personal wealth and that of other partners, Dennis founded Institutional Venture Partners in 1980. The first IVP fund had $22 million. In a field that was generally male-dominated, Ruthann Quindlen became a rare female general partner in 1994. After the burst of the dot-com bubble in 1999, partners from IVP combined with Brentwood Venture Capital formed Redpoint Ventures, which would specialize in later-stage digital media and Internet companies, and Palladium Venture Capital to focus on health science investments. IVP specializes in venture growth investments, industry rollups, founder liquidity transactions, and select public market investments. It only makes a small number (about 12 to 15) relatively large investments per year. Its fourteenth fund raised about $1 billion in June 2012. Its fifteenth fund raised $1.4 billion in April 2015. Its sixteenth fund raised $1.5 billion in September 2017.

Industry recognitions
In 2014, AlwaysOn named IVP in its Top 25 VC Firms List.
In 2015, GrowthCap named IVP #1 on their Top 25 Growth Equity Firms List. Entrepreneur Magazine named IVP on their VC 100 List.
IVP ranked #2 as the Top VC in Mobile by App Portfolio Downloads by Sensor Tower In addition, IVP was listed as one of the Most Active Bay Area VC Firms Ranked by Number of Deals in 2015 by San Francisco Business Times.
In 2016, PitchBook ranked IVP #2 as The Most Active VC Investor in the U.S.- based Tech Companies That Have Completed an IPO Since the Beginning of 2011. 
CB Insights ranked IVP #3 among top investors that are consistently in the top tech exits.

References

External links

Venture capital firms of the United States
Financial services companies established in 1980